Ranjit Vilas Palace may refer to:

 Ranjit Vilas Palace (Rajkot), a palace in Rajkot, Gujarat, India
 Ranjit Vilas Palace (Ratlam), a palace in Ratlam, Madhya Pradesh, India
 Ranjit Vilas Palace (Wankaner), a palace in Wankaner, Gujarat, India